Gari may refer to:

Places 
Gari, Tombouctou Region, Mali, a village
Gari, Russia, several inhabited localities
Gari, Kruševac, Serbia, a village
Gari (river), Monte Cassino, Lazio, Italy
Gari, an Indigenous name for Fraser Island in Queensland, Australia
Gari, a crater on Mars

People 
Gari (name), a list of people with the given name, nickname or surname

Other uses 
Gari (ginger), a Japanese condiment
Gari (bivalve), a bivalve mollusk genus
Gari (vehicle), a cart
Gari (band), a Japanese electro rock band formed in 1997
Gari (sword), a traditional Indonesian sword
Revolutionary Internationalist Action Groups (Groupes d'action révolutionnaire internationalistes), a 1970s French Marxist terrorist group

See also
Gari-ye Bala ("Upper Gari"), Iran
Gari-ye Pain ("Lower Gari"), Iran
Garri, a West African flour-like food made from cassava
Gaari (disambiguation)
Ghari (disambiguation)
Gharry
Garre